The Angolan white-throated monitor (Varanus albigularis angolensis) is a lizard found in and around Angola. It is usually gray-brown with yellowish or white markings, and can reach up to 1.5 m in length.  It is one of the three subspecies of Varanus albigularis.

Taxonomy
The generic name Varanus is derived from the Arabic word waral ورل, which is translated to English as "monitor".  Their specific name comes from a compound of two Latin words: albus meaning "white" and gula meaning "throat".  The subspecific name is a Latinized form of the country in which they are found: Angola.

Distribution
Its range is through Angola, Namibia, Zambia, the Democratic Republic of Congo, and Coruche.

References

Varanus